Ross Cady (1884-1959) was an American politician from Idaho. Cady served briefly as mayor of Boise, Idaho in 1933.

Early life 
On October 29, 1884, Cady was born in Hubbard, Iowa.

Career 
In military, Cady enlisted during World War II in the United States military in Holl Boise, Idaho.

In 1933, Cady was appointed mayor of Boise, Idaho. Cady served the remainder of the term of James P. Pope, who resigned after being elected to the United States Senate.

References

External links 
Mayors of Boise - Past and Present

1884 births
1959 deaths
Mayors of Boise, Idaho
People from Hardin County, Iowa